Burchard David Mauchart (19 April 1696 – 11 April 1751) was professor of anatomy and surgery at the University of Tübingen, Germany, and a pioneer in the field of ophthalmology. In 1748 he became one of the first to document the eye disorder now known as keratoconus. His surviving works are now to be found in the form of theses by his students.

He obtained his Lic. Med. degree in 1722 at the University of Tübingen. Mauchart also studied for two years in Paris from 1718-1720 under the oculist Woolhouse.

References
 Biographisches Lexikon der hervorragenden Ärzte, Urban & Schwarzenberg, 1962, vol. 4, pp. 121–122.
 Jöcher's Allgemeine Gelehrten Lexicon, Georg Jöntzen, 1810–1813, vol. 4 (suppl.), col 1014.
 Nouvelle Biographie Générale, Firmin, Didot Frères, 1852–1866, vol. 34, col 341–342.
 Allgemeine Deutsche Biographie, Duncker & Humblot, 1967–1971, Reprint, vol. 20, p. 687.
 Michaud Biographie Universelle (2nd Ed.), Delagrabe, 1843–1865, vol. 27, pp. 301–302.
 Rebus Sci. Nat. Med., 1752, 1(part 3), pp. 531–538.
 F. Börner, Nachrichten von dem Vornehmsten Lebensumständen und Schriften Jetzlebender Berühmter Aerzte und Naturforscher, J. C. Meissner, 1749, vol. 1, pp. 345–363.

External links
 

1696 births
1751 deaths
German ophthalmologists